Nguyễn Trần Khánh Vân (born 25 February 1995) is a Vietnamese model and beauty pageant titleholder who was crowned Miss Universe Vietnam 2019. She represented Vietnam at Miss Universe 2020 pageant and finished as a Top 21 semi-finalist.

Early life and education
Khánh Vân was born in Ho Chi Minh City (Saigon). She attended the Ho Chi Minh City University of Theater Stage and Cinema, where she saved the result from 2015.

Pageantry
Khánh Vân began her pageantry career in 2013, when she was crowned Miss Teen Áo dài Vietnam 2013, a Vietnamese beauty pageant where young women competed in the traditional áo dài national garment. Afterwards, she placed as the second runner-up in the Vietnamese pageant Miss Star 2014. Khánh Vân began participating in more major national pageants that year as well, placing in the Top 40 of Miss Vietnam 2014, and later in the Top 10 of Miss Universe Vietnam 2015.

In 2018, she competed in the Vietnamese model search competition Vietnam Supermodel 2018, in which she was mentored by Vietnamese singer and presenter Hương Giang. Khánh Vân advanced to the finale of the series until being declared one of the runners-up. A year later, she returned to pageantry and competed in Miss Universe Vietnam 2019. Khánh Vân advanced through the multiple stages of the competition, ultimately being crowned the winner by outgoing titleholder H'Hen Niê. As the winner of Miss Universe Vietnam 2019, she represented Vietnam at Miss Universe 2020.

Miss Universe 2020 
The 69th Miss Universe competition was supposed to be held in 2020, but delayed to May 2021 due to the disruption of the COVID-19 pandemic. As the winner of Miss Universe Vietnam 2019, Khánh Vân joined Miss Universe 2020 at Seminole Hard Rock Hotel & Casino in Hollywood, Florida with other 73 women from around the world.

According to Miss Universe official website, Khánh Vân's biography is described as:

During the national costume competition on May 14, 2021, she impressed the audiences by wearing "Kén Em", a Cocoon costume inspired by the image of the silkworm cocoon used in silk weaving. "Kén Em" was 100 percent made using a meticulous hand-knitting technique, which also symbolizes the virtuous and patient spirit of the Vietnamese people. It was one of the six favorite national costumes chosen by Catriona Gray, the former Miss Universe 2018.

After the preliminary competition and a closed-door interview, she managed to enter top 21 semifinalist and received the highest number of fan votes in the history of Miss Universe.

References

External links

1994 births
21st-century Vietnamese actresses
Living people
Miss Universe 2020 contestants
People from Ho Chi Minh City
Vietnamese beauty pageant winners
Vietnamese female models
Vietnamese film actresses